Troppo is an Australian television drama series which premiered on ABC TV on 27 February 2022.

Premise
Troppo is based on the best-selling novel Crimson Lake by Candice Fox, in which a former police officer helps a private investigator look for a missing man in Far North Queensland.

Cast

Main

Supporting and recurring

Episodes

Production
The series was created by Yolanda Ramke, and Jocelyn Moorhouse is set-up director. Karl Zwicky is the series producer, with executive producers AGC's Stuart Ford and Lourdes Diaz; Thomas Jane, and Courtney Lauren Penn; ABC's Sally Riley and Andrew Gregory; EQ Media Group's Greg Quail, Simonne Overend and Lisa Duff; Beyond Entertainment's Mikael Borglund and David Ogilvy; and Jack Christian and D.J. McPherson.

The eight-part series was filmed in the Gold Coast hinterland of Queensland, Australia, although the story is set in Far North Queensland. Filming concluded in October 2021.

Release 
The series premiered on ABC TV and ABC iview in Australia on 27 February 2022.

In the United States, IMDb TV (now Amazon Freevee) picked up the series, and it premiered on 20 May 2022.

Viewership

References

External links
 

2022 Australian television series debuts
Australian Broadcasting Corporation original programming
English-language television shows
Television shows filmed in Australia
Television shows set in Queensland
Television shows based on Australian novels
Television series by Beyond Television Productions